One Lane Bridge is a New Zealand crime drama television series, premiering on TVNZ 1 in 2020. The series stars Dominic Ona-Ariki as Ariki Davis, a newcomer detective, Joel Tobeck as Stephen Tremaine, his superior, and Alison Bruce as Tremaine's wife, Lois. The show follows events around the latest in a mysterious chain of deaths which have occurred on a one-lane bridge near the town of Queenstown. The series is also notable for its inclusion of aspects of Māori spirituality as a core part of the plot, such as the notion of matakite, roughly equivalent to divination.

Other filming locations include the Queenstown waterfront and areas around the nearby town of Arrowtown.

One Lane Bridge premiered in April 2020 on TVNZ 1, in the middle of New Zealand's first lockdown of the COVID-19 pandemic. The show was met with mixed reviews, with Stuff's Malcolm Hopwood describing the characters as "tight-lipped, charmless, one-dimensional people" and the Spinoff's Catherine McGregor saying that the writing of the series "fails to live up to the drama of its breathtaking location". Stuff's James Croot was more positive, describing season 1 as "an engrossing, evocative, supernatural-tinged detective drama, a Central Otago-set Kiwi answer to Scandi-Noir complete with terrific performances from a well-assembled ensemble."

Cast
 Dominic Ona-Ariki as Ariki Davis
 Joel Tobeck as Stephen Tremaine
 Alison Bruce as Lois Tremaine
 Alex Walker as Joe
 Phoebe McKellar as Tilly
 Michelle Langstone as Charlotte McCrae (Seasons 1-2)
 Phil Brown as Mark 'Haggis' McCrae (Seasons 1-2)
 Nathalie Morris as Emma Ryder (Seasons 1-2)
 Jared Turner as Rob Ryder (Seasons 1-2)
 Nicola Kānawa as Pounamu Edwards (Season 3)
 Roxie Mohebbi as Frankie Azad (Season 3)

Episodes

Series overview

Series 1 (2020)

Series 2 (2021)

Series 3 (2022)

Production 
Season 1 of One Lane Bridge was filmed over three months in late 2019 by Great Southern Television, entirely on location in the Queenstown area. The series initially had a budget of NZ$7 million, which was supported through funding from NZ on Air, Australia's Seven Network, and All3Media. Filming for season 2 took place over 10 weeks in February 2021, on a slightly smaller budget of $6 million. Queenstown mayor Jim Boult has been vocally supportive of the series, having written a letter of support to help secure funding for the production of the show's second season.

In September 2021, TVNZ announced that One Lane Bridge had been renewed for a third season and pledged up to $5,945,400 for this, which it said would "build on the previous season's talent development opportunities across directing, production, and script writing for local and emerging practitioners." Season three premiered on TVNZ1 on 7 November 2022, with all episodes in the series available for streaming on TVNZ's online platform TVNZ+ at the same point.

References

External links
 
 
 

2020 New Zealand television series debuts
English-language television shows
New Zealand drama television series
Television shows set in New Zealand
TVNZ 1 original programming